Graham James Davies (born 1935) was the Archdeacon of St Davids from 1996 until 2002.

Davies was educated at St David's College, Lampeter. After curacies in Johnston, Pembrokeshire, and Llangathen, he was a Minor Canon at St David's Cathedral. He held incumbencies at Hubberston, Cwmdauddwr and Kidwelly before his appointment as archdeacon.

References

1935 births
Alumni of the University of Wales, Lampeter
Archdeacons of St Davids
Church in Wales archdeacons
20th-century Welsh Anglican priests
21st-century Welsh Anglican priests
Living people